Cybaeodes is a genus of spiders in the family Liocranidae. It was first described in 1878 by Simon. , it contains 13 species from southern Europe and north Africa.

Species
Cybaeodes comprises the following species:
Cybaeodes alicatai Platnick & Di Franco, 1992
Cybaeodes avolensis Platnick & Di Franco, 1992
Cybaeodes carusoi Platnick & Di Franco, 1992
Cybaeodes dosaguas Ribera & De Mas, 2015
Cybaeodes indalo Ribera & De Mas, 2015
Cybaeodes liocraninus (Simon, 1913)
Cybaeodes madidus Simon, 1914
Cybaeodes magnus Ribera & De Mas, 2015
Cybaeodes mallorcensis Wunderlich, 2008
Cybaeodes marinae Di Franco, 1989
Cybaeodes molara (Roewer, 1960)
Cybaeodes sardus Platnick & Di Franco, 1992
Cybaeodes testaceus Simon, 1878

References

Liocranidae
Araneomorphae genera
Spiders of Africa